Jean Boyer may refer to:

 Jean Boyer (director) (1901–1965), French film director and songwriter 
 Jean Boyer (footballer) (1901–1981), French footballer 
 Jean Boyer (politician) (born 1937), French politician 
 Jean Boyer (composer) (died 1648), French viol player and composer 
 Jean Boyer (organist) (1948–2004), French organist and professor